Rabong or Ravangla is a small tourist town with an elevation of 8000 feet located, near Namchi City in the Namchi district  of the Indian state of Sikkim. It is connected by state highway to other major towns in the state and lies between Namchi,  Pelling and Gangtok. It is the starting point for the trek to Maenam Wildlife Sanctuary. It is approximately 65 km from the state capital, Gangtok, and 120 km from Siliguri, West Bengal. The name is derived from the Sikkimese language. ‘Ra’ means wild sheep, 'vong' translates to a rearing place, and ‘la’ means a pass.

Geography 
Mt. Kanchenjunga, Mt. Pandim, Mt. Siniolchu, Mt. Kabru are some of the major peaks visible from Ravangla.

Flora 
Upper parts of Ravangla usually experience snowfall during winter. During the months of April–May, the area is surrounded by many flowers including orchids and rhododendrons.

Fauna 

Ravangla attracts many Himalayan birds. Verditer flycatchers, blue-fronted redstarts, grey bush chats, dark-throated thrush, blue whistling-thrush, green-backed tits, and white-browed fantails are common.

The forests around Ravangla have other birds like laughing thrushes, babblers, cuckoos, and hill partridges. The rare satyr tragopan can also be spotted in Ravangla.

Tibetan community 
A Tibetan community is located 1 km away from the Ravangla Market. It consists of seven camps, with 328.5 acres of total land and 1,300 people. The Tibetan settlement has one primary Tibetan medium school, two monasteries, administrative offices, and a primary health care clinic. Ralang Monastery, a Buddhist monastery of the Kagyu school of Tibetan Buddhism is located 6 km from Ravangla. The old monastery is also a few kilometers from Borong. There are many small hamlets where these communities live. Tourism is a major source of income for these communities.

Education
NIT Sikkim has a temporary campus in the town.

Gallery

See also
Chidam
Damthang, Sikkim

References

External links 

Cities and towns in Namchi district